The 1969 animated film A Boy Named Charlie Brown, based on Charles M. Schulz's comic strip Peanuts, had two different soundtrack albums. These albums were released individually in 1970 and 2017.

Background
A Boy Named Charlie Brown is the debut theatrical film based on the Peanuts comic strip by Charles M. Schulz. For the music score, producer Lee Mendelson recruited jazz pianist Vince Guaraldi, who had previously composed uptempo jazz melodies for the first six Peanuts television specials as well as the unaired documentary of the same name. Guaraldi did not compose new songs for the film, but instead fitted established compositions with a more theatrical treatment featuring lusher horn-filled arrangements. Instrumental tracks used in the film included new versions of the songs "Skating", "Baseball Theme", "Charlie Brown and His All-Stars", "Oh, Good Grief", "Air Music", "Blue Charlie Brown", and several variations of the Peanuts franchise theme song, "Linus and Lucy". Guaraldi also resurrected the non-Peanuts song "Lucifer's Lady" from his album The Eclectic Vince Guaraldi (1969), retitled "Kite Music (Lucifer's Lady)".

To fill out the sound, Mendelson also hired composer/arranger John Scott Trotter (who also worked in concert with Guaraldi since 1966's It's the Great Pumpkin, Charlie Brown) and composer/singer Rod McKuen. When discussing the augmentation of Guaraldi's established jazz scores with additional musicians, Mendelson commented, "It wasn’t that we thought Vince's jazz couldn't carry the movie, but we wanted to supplement it with some 'big screen music.' We focused on Vince for the smaller, more intimate Charlie Brown scenes; for the larger moments, we turned to Trotter's richer, full-score sound." Guaraldi's services were passed over entirely for the second Peanuts feature film, Snoopy Come Home, with Mendelson turning to longtime Disney composers the Sherman Brothers to compose the music score.

The film included several original songs, some of which boasted vocals: "Failure Face", "I Before E" and "Champion Charlie Brown". McKuen wrote and sang the title song, as well as writing "Failure Face" and "Champion Charlie Brown". Trotter composed additional songs, like "Cloud Dreams", "Catatonic Blues" and "Bus Wheel Blues".

Several recording sessions occurred between April and October 1969, all under the supervision of Trotter. He and Guaraldi booked several jazz combos for one date; Guaraldi worked solely with trio sidemen Peter Marshall and Jerry Granelli on another.

A soundtrack album with dialogue from the film was released on the Columbia Masterworks label in 1970 titled A Boy Named Charlie Brown: Selections from the Film Soundtrack. The first all-music version of the soundtrack was released on CD by Kritzerland Records as a limited issue of 1,000 copies in 2017, titled A Boy Named Charlie Brown: Original Motion Picture Soundtrack.

A Boy Named Charlie Brown: Selections from the Film Soundtrack

A Boy Named Charlie Brown: Selections from the Film Soundtrack is the first of two soundtracks issued for the film, released in early 1970. The soundtrack was a commercial success and was nominated for an Academy Award for Best Original Score, ultimately losing to The Beatles' Let It Be. A Boy Named Charlie Brown: Selections from the Film Soundtrack was out of print by 1973. , it has not been issued on CD.

Unlike traditional music soundtracks, A Boy Named Charlie Brown: Selections from the Film Soundtrack was presented as a condensed book-and-record radio play version of the film, running approximately 50 minutes in length. Most musical segments act as underscores behind dialogue.

Track listing 
Despite individual tracks being listed on the album, track running times for each title were not published.

A Boy Named Charlie Brown: Original Motion Picture Soundtrack 

A Boy Named Charlie Brown: Original Motion Picture Soundtrack is the second of two soundtracks issued for the film. It was released on CD by Kritzerland Records in 2017 with a limited run of 1,000 copies, which sold out within one week of release.

Vince Guaraldi historian and author Derrick Bang referred to the 2017 release as the "Guaraldi Holy Grail" for fans of the jazz pianist. For many years, the logistics involved in releasing a music-only soundtrack were daunting. Licensing issues were complex as both Columbia Masterworks Records and Cinema Center Films had ceased to exist decades earlier and asset ownership passed along to a number of subsequent corporate entities. The music itself also posed challenges, as it involved not only Guaraldi's estate (Guaraldi died in 1976), but those associated with John Scott Trotter and Rod McKuen, who had died in 1975 and 2015, respectively.

Track listing 

Track 18, "Linus and Lucy (Found Blanket)", is the same flute-driven, monaural version used during the cold open scene in It's the Great Pumpkin, Charlie Brown (1966).

Personnel 
Credits were adapted from 2017 liner notes.
Vince Guaraldi Nonet
 Vince Guaraldi – piano
 Conte Candoli – trumpet
 Milton Bernhart – trombone
 Herb Ellis – guitar
 Monty Budwig – double bass
 Peter Marshall – double bass
 Jerry Granelli – drums
 Jack Sperling – drums
 Victor Feldman – percussion

Vince Guaraldi Sextet
Vince Guaraldi – piano, electric keyboards, arranger
Emmanuel Klein – trumpet 
John Gray – guitar 
Ronald Lang – woodwinds 
Monty Budwig – double bass 
Colin Bailey – drums 

Additional
 Phil Macy – engineer (1970 release) 
 Derrick Bang – liner notes (2017 release)

References

External links
 "You're Finally a Film Score, Charlie Brown": A track-by-track analysis of A Boy Named Charlie Brown by Derrick Bang

1970 soundtrack albums
2017 soundtrack albums
Albums arranged by Vince Guaraldi
Vince Guaraldi soundtracks
Cool jazz soundtracks
Mainstream jazz soundtracks
Peanuts music